Witness J, also known by the pseudonyms Alan Johns and Prisoner 123458, is a former Australian intelligence officer who was subject to a secret trial (under section 22 of the National Security Information (NSI) Act), and secret imprisonment in 2018, for supposedly breaching Australian national security laws. His case came to light following an Australian Federal Police raid of his jail cell seeking a memoir that he had previously received official permission to write about his experiences. This led to him bringing a claim for breach of his human rights.

The case sparked debate in the media about the unprecedented secrecy of the proceedings and its violation of the open justice principle underpinning Australia's legal system. The Australian Capital Territory's Justice Minister Shane Rattenbury was unaware of the secret prisoner until learning about him through the media even though Prisoner J had been held in the Territory's Alexander Maconochie Centre over which Rattenbury had ministerial oversight. The use of a wholly closed criminal trial in the matter was described as "unprecedented" by the Independent National Security Legislation Monitor, with the possible exception of trials during World War I or World War II.

Witness J is a graduate of The Royal Military Collage, Duntroon and served with distinction in East Timor, Afghanistan and Iraq.

On 9 June 2021 a public hearing into how section 22 of the National Security Information (NSI) Act was used to secretly convict witness J was made by The Independent National Security Legislation Monitor (INSLM) Grant Donaldson. The hearing found that after having his employment terminated he used an open network to air complaints against his agency. In the course of this correspondence he had revealed classified information which could endanger the lives of others.

Witness J pleaded guilty to the charges and received a sentence of 15 months at Canberra's Alexander Maconochie Centre sexual offender wing, despite not being a sexual offender. The secrecy of the trial has been widely condemned, with New South Wales Supreme Court Justice Anthony Whealy questioning whether Australia is becoming a totalitarian state.

Witness J was released from custody in August 2019, subject to regular psychological testing and an overseas travel ban.

In 2020 Witness J released the book Here There Are Dragons, based in his experiences while incarcerated in the Alexander Maconochie Centre. Profits of the book go to a mental health charity due to proceeds of crime laws.

See also
 Bernard Collaery - Australian lawyer charged under the National Security Information (NSI) Act
 David McBride - Australian whistleblower

References 

Australian prisoners and detainees
Secrecy
Law of Australia
National security of Australia
Human rights abuses in Australia
2018 in Australia
Year of birth missing (living people)
Living people
Pseudonyms